John Baine may refer to:

 Attila the Stockbroker (John Baine, born 1957), English punk poet, musician and songwriter
 John Baine (politician), American politician in the Arkansas House of Representatives

See also 
 John Bayne (disambiguation)
 John Baines (disambiguation)